B-Projekt, born Gurmeet Arora, is an Indian record producer and DJ. Formerly known as DJ Bunty, he started his career in the year 2000 by deejaying in nightclubs in the Mumbai area and formed his own nightclub management company – Plan B Entertainment. He continued to deejay at night clubs in Mumbai gaining popularity as "Dj Bunty." Today, B is an owner of a nightclub in Mumbai called "Tryst".

B-Projekt began his musical career studying music production at the London School of Sound. After a few years of performing in Mumbai & London, he went on to produce his debut album. B-Projekt was signed by Universal Music Group in August 2009 for the release of his debut album Blindfolded.

B-Projekt is one of the few DJs from Mumbai to produce a crossover Punjabi album, collaborating with British Punjabi vocalist Juggy D from the Rishi Rich Project. B-Projekt launched his debut album Blindfolded in Mumbai, Delhi, Chandigarh & London.
His single "Ni Soniye" feat. Juggy D & Raja Wilco was nominated in the Ptc music awards 2010.

Music and DJ career
B-Projekt's early DJ'ing started with inter-college festivals held in College in the inter-space city of Mumbai. India. Then known as DJ BunTea, he gained popularity amongst the young DJ circuit of the city. In 2000, he placed second in the Umang Festival of Mithibai College of Commerce & Arts. Later in the year, he was one of the youngest DJs in his area. B was later invited to judge the upcoming DJs in the city at some of the most reputed colleges in the Mumbai, including Malhar, Kshitij, SIES, NIFT. In 2001, he was offered a residency in Provogue Lounge. His residency lasted for one year before the lounge was shut down,

Debut album 
Blindfolded was released on 15 October 2009 in India & 20 November 2009 in UK & rest of the world. The album features singles like "Ni Soniye", "Naal Nachona", "Aye mere Humsafar" (remix). "Ni Soniye" was selected as no.2 on BBC Asian Network track list by the Punjabi hit squad, and on BBC Asian Network in DJ Kayper's track listing

Collaborations in Blindfolded 
B-Projekt collaborated with Juggy D from the UK, G-Deep, Raja Wilco & Josyln John from the USA.

Discography

Solo albums 
 2009 : Blindfolded

Singles

Club Tere Naal Nachda Vol.1 (2010) 
 2010 : Club Tere Naal Nachda (Featuring Master Rakesh)
 2010 : Naal Nachona (Featuring G-Deep & Raja Wilco)
 2013 : Labna ni Tenu (FT. Omer Inayat)

Entrepreneur in B-Projekt

Plan B Entertainment
B-projekt is a co-founder of the event management company Plan B Entertainment.

10 Productions 

10 Productions aims to help new artists to be successful. From Bollywood, gigs to press mentions, and online promotions to high-profile event appearances, the company considers all aspects of publicity. They are backed by their sister company Plan B Entertainment, which is associated with F & B brands – Prive, Valhalla, and Play.

New-on-the-scene, 10 Productions has already collaborated with acts such as UK-based singer Juggy D and launched B-Projekt's debut music album Blindfolded in 2009. In addition, they work with a slew of Indian and international DJs, providing them access to clubs and parties in the city. With a company slogan that promises to “dream, create, achieve”, young artists and their aspirations are in capable hands with 10 Productions.

References

External links
Official web site

Photos from – Juggy D & B Projekt at Kshitij '09
 Photos from - Juggy D & B Projekt at Kshitij ’09

Behind the Scenes of B Projekt's 'Naal Nachona' Video
 Behind the Scenes of B Projekt's 'Naal Nachona' Video

Exclusive Interview with B Projekt
 Exclusive Interview with B Projekt

Juggy D and B Projekt's Show on 18 Dec at Mithibai College. (Teaser)
 Juggy D and B Projekt's Show on 18th Dec at Mithibai College. (Teaser)   college-teaser

B Projekt ft G-Deep & Raja Wilco – Naal Nachona (Video)
 B Projekt ft G-Deep & Raja Wilco - Naal Nachona (Video)

B-Projekt's 'Tryst' nightclub venture in Mumbai
 B-Projekt's 'Tryst' nightclub venture in Mumbai

1984 births
Living people
Musicians from Mumbai
Musicians from London
Desi musicians